Typhinellus laminatus is a species of sea snail, a marine gastropod mollusk, in the family Muricidae, the murex snails or rock snails.

Description
The length of the shell attains 16.3 mm.

Distribution
This species occurs in Madagascar.

References

External links
  Houart R. & Héros V. (2015). New species of Muricidae Rafinesque, 1815 (Mollusca: Gastropoda) from the Western Indian Ocean. Zoosystema. 37(3): 481-503

laminatus
Gastropods described in 2015